European Memoirs (a.k.a. Memoir in Japan) is the tenth studio recording of the Toshiko Akiyoshi – Lew Tabackin Big Band.  Akiyoshi was nominated for a 1983 Grammy award in the Best Instrumental Arrangement category for the arrangement of "Remembering Bud" on this album. 
This would be the final recording of the Los Angeles-based Toshiko Akiyoshi – Lew Tabackin Big Band before the principals moved to New York City in 1982 and formed a new big band, the "Toshiko Akiyoshi Jazz Orchestra featuring Lew Tabackin" that released nine more albums and two live performance videos before disbanding in 2003.

Track listing
All songs composed and arranged by Toshiko Akiyoshi:
LP side A
 "Remembering Bud" – 8:55
 "Feast in Milano" – 4:50
 "Relaxing at Zell am See" – 8:14
LP side B
 "Two Faces of a Nation"
 Part 1 – 9:22
 Part 2 – 10:02

Personnel
Toshiko Akiyoshi – piano
Lew Tabackin – tenor saxophone, flute, piccolo
John Gross – tenor saxophone, flute, clarinet
Matt Catingub – alto saxophone, soprano saxophone, flute, clarinet
Bob Sheppard – alto saxophone, soprano saxophone, flute
Bill Byrne – baritone saxophone, soprano saxophone, bass clarinet, alto flute
Buddy Childers – trumpet
Larry Ford – trumpet
Steven Huffsteter – trumpet
Mike Price – trumpet
Hart Smith – trombone
Dave Bowman – trombone
Bruce Fowler – trombone
Phil Teele – bass trombone
Bob Bowman – bass
Joey Baron – drums

Other 
Anonymous – voice (on "Two Faces of a Nation," Part 1)

References / External links
RCA Victor (Japan) Records RVC RJL-8036
Ascent Records ASC 1003
[ Allmusic]
LA Times 1983 Grammy award nominations

Toshiko Akiyoshi – Lew Tabackin Big Band albums
1982 albums